Velobike is a bicycle-sharing system run by the city of Moscow, Russia.

History
The system was opened in 2013. In 2015 the 1st generation of the system was fully replaced by the Smoove-based solution using B’TWIN bicycles.

In 2016 the service had also introduced e-bikes to its service. In 2018 e-bikes were replaced by a fleet of pedelecs.

In 2018 there were 430 parking stations in the system with 4,300 bicycles. This season the system had 424,736 users registered and 4.25 million journeys were performed.

Overview

A user has to pay by a payment card (Visa, Mastercard, Mir) for a subscription to the system either at the web site, mobile app or the Velobike's station terminal (where available). Access to a bicycle is arranged by account number (user ID) / PIN pair. A Troika transport card can also be used instead of the account number.

During all the years of operation project was sponsored by various Russian banks: initially by the Bank of Moscow, then by the Sberbank of Russia and later on by the VTB Bank. The capital costs are covered by a sponsor while operating costs are covered by the city.

Subscription plans 
User can buy subscription on day/week/month or season (from may to october) with different number of free minutes 30 or 60, and can buy also insurance. Time more than free minutes is paid additionally.   

All subscription include unlimited number of rides.

See also 
 Outline of cycling
 Short term hire schemes

References

External links

 Velobike - Official Site

Cycling in Russia
Transport in Moscow
Community bicycle programs
Bicycle sharing in Russia